Francis Schüssler Fiorenza is an American theologian who currently holds the post of Charles Chancey Stillman Research Professor of Roman Catholic Theological Studies at Harvard Divinity School.

Biography
Born Francis Fiorenza in 1941, as a young man he entered St. Mary's Seminary and University in Baltimore, Maryland, from which he earned the degree of Master of Divinity, even though he did not intend to pursue ordination. In 1963 he won a fellowship to study theology in Germany under the Jesuit theologian Karl Rahner at the University of Munich. Because that university would not accept doctoral candidates to work under Rahner, he instead enrolled at the University of Münster, where he eventually earned the degree of Doctor of Theology, having studied under Johann Baptist Metz and Joseph Ratzinger (the future Pope Benedict XVI). It was while studying there that he met his future wife, Elisabeth Schüssler Fiorenza, a feminist Catholic theologian. Rahner transferred to Münster two years later, so he was able to accomplish his original goal.

Now Francis Schüssler Fiorenza as a result of his marriage, he returned to the United States with his wife, where they obtained teaching positions at the University of Notre Dame in Indiana. Subsequent to that, he taught at Villanova University in Pennsylvania, and The Catholic University of America in Washington, D.C.

In 1986, Fiorenza joined the faculty of the Harvard Divinity School, where his wife also became a professor. In 2021, he retired from active teaching duties and became a research professor. His primary interests are in the fields of fundamental or foundational theology, in which he explores the significance of contemporary hermeneutical theories as well as neo-pragmatic criticisms of foundationalism. His writings on political theology engage recent theories of justice, especially those of John Rawls and Jürgen Habermas, and have dealt with issues of work and welfare. He has also written on the history of 19th- and 20th-century theology, focusing on both Roman Catholic and Protestant theologians.

Fiorenza was awarded the Henry Luce III Fellowship for 2005-06 for research in the history of 20th-century Roman Catholic theology, namely, the direction known as the nouvelle théologie ("new theology"). This was a school of thought which originated at the Jesuit seminary of Lyons, France, and the work of the Jesuit theologian Henri de Lubac, and which sought to explore a perspective in theology from the earlier roots of the Church, prior to Scholasticism and the theology of the Council of Trent.

Foundational Theology: Jesus and the Church is one of his earliest and best-known books. He has published widely, with more than 150 essays in the areas of fundamental theology, hermeneutics, and political theology, as well as several other books.

Works
 Foundational Theology: Jesus and the Church (Crossroad Publishing Company, 1984) 
 Systematic Theology, volumes 1 and 2 (Fortress Press, 1991)
 Modern Christian Thought: The Twentieth Century James C. Livingston and Francis Schüssler Fiorenza, 2nd edition (Fortress Press, 2006) 
 Systematic Theology: Roman Catholic Perspectives, Francis Schüssler Fiorenza and John P. Galvin, editors, 2nd edition (Fortress Press, 2011) 
 Rights at Risk: Confronting the Cultural, Ethical, and Religious Challenges (Continuum, 2012) 
 Political Theology: Contemporary Challenges and Future Directions Francis Schüssler Fiorenza, Klaus Tanner and Michael Welker, editors (Westminster John Knox Press, 2013)

References

Year of birth missing (living people)
Living people
St. Mary's Seminary and University alumni
University of Münster alumni
20th-century American Roman Catholic theologians
21st-century American Roman Catholic theologians
Lay theologians
Systematic theologians
University of Notre Dame faculty
Catholic University of America faculty
Villanova University faculty
Harvard Divinity School faculty
Political theologians